Carlos Manuel Vaz Pinto (born 22 August 1974) is a Portuguese football manager who is currently the head coach of the I-League club Sreenidi Deccan.

Career

Vaz Pinto started his managerial career with Angolan side Recreativo da Caála, helping them reach the 2012 Angola Cup final, their only major final. In 2017, he was appointed manager of St. George in Ethiopia, helping them win the 2017 Ethiopian Super Cup. In 2021, Vaz Pinto was appointed manager of Kenyan club Gor Mahia, helping them win the 2021 FKF President's Cup, but left due to family reasons.

In 2022, he was appointed manager of Sreenidi Deccan in India.

References

External links
 Carlos Vaz Pinto at playmakerstats.com

Living people
1974 births
Portuguese football managers
Ethiopian Premier League managers
Girabola managers
Gor Mahia F.C. managers
Saint George S.C. managers
Sreenidi Deccan FC head coaches
Portuguese expatriate football managers
Portuguese expatriate sportspeople in Angola
Expatriate football managers in Angola
Portuguese expatriate sportspeople in Ethiopia
Expatriate football managers in Ethiopia
Portuguese expatriate sportspeople in India
Expatriate football managers in India